Joshua Mail (born 18 December 1974 in Adelaide, South Australia) is a former Australian rules footballer who played with the Adelaide Crows in the Australian Football League (AFL).

Mail attended Northfield Primary and Northfield High schools in Adelaide and played for South Australian Amateur Football League (SAAFL) club Gepps Cross before his recruitment by South Australian National Football League (SANFL) club North Adelaide.

Mail made his senior SANFL debut in 1991 aged 16 years and 95 days, becoming the seventh youngest footballer in SANFL history.

A South Australian Teal Cup representative under the coaching of four-time Magarey Medallist and SANFL legend Russell Ebert, Mail played as a rover, forward and defender and was selected by Adelaide at #27 in the 1993 Pre-Season Draft.

Mail made his AFL debut against  at Football Park in Round 10 of the 1994 AFL season and marked an impressive debut with 11 kicks, 5 marks and 4 handballs. He went on to play in the next three games for the Crows during the season but couldn't cement his place in the side, instead playing most of the season with North Adelaide.

References

1974 births
Australian rules footballers from South Australia
Adelaide Football Club players
North Adelaide Football Club players
Devonport Football Club players
Living people